Remix is a Candan Erçetin album. There are remixes of "Neden" in this album. There is also a song named "Yazık Oldu" which is a song from Pjer Žalica's movie Fuse.

Track listing

Candan Erçetin albums
2003 remix albums